Argophara is a genus of moth in the family Gelechiidae. It contains the species Argophara epaxia, which is found in Namibia.

References

Endemic fauna of Namibia
Gelechiinae
Monotypic moth genera
Moths of Africa